SchemingMind is a privately owned international correspondence chess club founded in 2002. Most games and tournaments are played on a correspondence chess server owned by the club for this purpose.

Teams representing SchemingMind regularly participate in ICCF events, for example the ICCF Champions League and International Friendly Matches.

History 
SchemingMind was created in 2002, initially as a private, invitation-based project.

Public registration has been available since April 2003. A few site announcements were posted throughout 2003 to chess newsgroups and forums.

SchemingMind was accepted as a member organisation of the British Federation for Correspondence Chess (BFCC) in 2007. This means that full members of SchemingMind may enter BFCC and ICCF events; BFCC membership also allows the club to play ICCF rated International Friendly Matches against other ICCF federations. Matches have been arranged against England, Denmark, Germany and Romania.

Site features 
SchemingMind is predominantly a correspondence chess club; however, a number of members also enjoy playing chess variants Chess960, Crazyhouse, Atomic chess, Shatranj, Thai Chess and almost 40 other chess variants (see complete list), and the site along with its members actively discuss, design and implement many chess variants.

The Fischer clock is used for time control. The following clocks are available:
 5d+12h (5 days of initial time, 12 hours increment, 10 days limit)
 10d+1d (10 days of initial time, 1 day increment, 30 days limit)
 30d+1d (30 days of initial time, 1 day increment, 45 days limit)
 30d+3d (30 days of initial time, 3 days increment, 60 days limit)
Holiday is available in case of longer absences - up to four weeks a year.
Players are able to extend repeated lifelines to opponents rather than force flag.

Games are rated using the Glicko rating system.

Competition formats includes free challenges, pyramids, team matches and leagues, as well as private or public mini-tournaments of either knockout, dropout or double round robin tournaments.

Dropout is a SchemingMind specific tournament scheme, invented as an intermediate step between knockout and Swiss. Swiss-like pairing is being used. Games are scored, with every loss being worth 3 points and every draw being worth 1 point. Players who get more than a specified limit (six or eight points, depending on tournament) are eliminated. The tournament is won by the sole remaining player, or the player with fewest points, if a few remain.

Access 
SchemingMind is mainly used through a web interface, with a JavaScript-based playing board. Some alternatives are offered for standard (non-variant) chess play:
 WAP (mobile) website interface,
 XFCC API protocol is supported, so any XFCC client can be used.

It is possible to play International Correspondence Chess Federation games from SchemingMind interface.

An annotated database of chess openings, (interactive Game Explorer) is available and is under constant revision by an International Master in correspondence chess.

Membership 
Full membership of SchemingMind is by payable subscription. However, a limited free membership is also available. Free membership puts limits on the number of simultaneous games and the frequency of tournament entry. Also some advanced site features (like team captaincy or openings database) are not available to free members. Full membership offers access to all site features.

The subscription is offered on a yearly basis and may be bought for personal use or in the form of a gift token.

See also
List of Internet chess servers

External links
Player resources:
 
 Documentation site (free registration required)
 Firefox Extension
 Frequently Asked Questions

Reviews, notes, etc.
 "The Check is in the Mail" March 2007 edition contains SchemingMind review by Alex Dunne (the Correspondence Chess director of USCF)
 SIM John C.Knudsen names SchemingMind among his recommendations in Correspondence Chess Starter Kit
 Social Correspondence Chess Association organises some of their tournaments on SchemingMind
 WildChess marks SchemingMind as recommendation
 Atomic Book names SchemingMind as one of the two correspondence atomic sites
 Correspondence servers review in Polish recommends SchemingMind as top choice

Chess websites
Internet chess servers